Ferdinand Lumban Tobing (19 February 1899 – 7 October 1962) was Minister of Manpower and Transmigration of the Republic of Indonesia, Minister for Communications and Information of the Republic of Indonesia, Minister of Health of the Republic of Indonesia, and Governor of North Sumatra, who is now regarded as a National Hero of Indonesia.

References

1899 births
1962 deaths
Indonesian Christians
National Heroes of Indonesia
People of Batak descent